Thoha Hamayoun is a historic village of Chakwal District, Punjab, Pakistan, which is almost 15 km from the city of Chakwal, closer to another historic town named Bhaun. Nobody exactly knows when this settlement came into existence. Mair Minhas, Jatt Marath, Rajpout, Kahout Quraish were some early settlers, upon request of villagers some Syed families settled in as well. This small hamlet turned into a village with the passage of time. The village was named as Thoha Hamayoun with association to His early settler of Mair Minhas, Rajput clan, whose name was Hamayoun, a descendant of the ruler of Kashmir. The famous thing of the village is that once king humayoun the mughal ruler took refuge at this land while fleeing from Sher Shah's revolt. Nothing much is known about Mughal period and other rulers time. Many notable Army men, bureaucrats, teachers, doctors etc this soil produced. As listened by elder the worst time for the village was Sikh Raj (1801–1849), when the gangs of Sikh Bandits and their tax collector (Kárdár) used to extort the produce as they desired from the threshing-floor at the time of harvesting.

Present day Village comprises fertile land, aggregation supremely depends on rains but few water pumping turbines are around. Wheat is the main crop along with mustard, canola, jowar and bajra (pearl millet) as second crops. Bull race karah popular sport of locals, been kept alive by few culture and tradition loving residents of area for several decades.

References

Populated places in Chakwal District